Neobathiea grandidierana is a species of orchid from Madagascar and the Comoros.  It is named after the French naturalist Alfred Grandidier, who devoted his life to the study of Madagascar. Among the 6 described species of Neobathiea, this species is the most widely distributed within Madagascar, occurring in Antsiranana, Antananarivo, Fianarantsoa, and Toliara.   In the Comoros, it occurs in Anjouan and Grande Comore.  The habitat of this species is humid forest on west-faching slopes at the elevation range of 1000-1650m.  In nature, the flowering season of this species is spring to early summer.

The long-spurred Neobathiea grandidierana from Madagascar is pollinated by a long-tongued sphinginid hawkmoth Panogena lingens with the pollinaria deposited on the basal part of the proboscis of the moth.

References

External links 
 
 

Orchids of Madagascar
Plants described in 1885
grandidierana